Francisco Pio Guadalupe Téllez (died 5 March 1660) was a Roman Catholic prelate who served as Archbishop of Santo Domingo (1648–1660).

Biography
On 23 November 1648, Francisco Pio Guadalupe Téllez was selected by the King of Spain and confirmed by Pope Innocent X as Archbishop of Santo Domingo. In 1649, he was consecrated bishop by Ramón Sentmenat y Lanuza, Bishop of Vic with Timoteo Pérez Vargas, Bishop Emeritus of Baghdad, and Blas Tineo Palacios, Auxiliary Bishop of Granada, as co-consecrators. He served as Archbishop of Santo Domingo until his death on 5 March 1660. His Vicar General was García Polanco

References

External links and additional sources
 (for Chronology of Bishops) 
 (for Chronology of Bishops) 

1660 deaths
Bishops appointed by Pope Innocent X
Roman Catholic archbishops of Santo Domingo
17th-century Roman Catholic archbishops in the Dominican Republic